The 15th Air Defense Division (Serbo-Croatian: 15. divizija protivvazdušne odbrane/ 15. дивизија противваздушне одбране) was an air defense division established in 1964 5th Air Defense Zone (Serbo-Croatian: 5. zona protivvazdušne odbrane / 5. зона противваздушне одбране).

History
The 5th Air Defense Zone was formed in 1964, and it was reorganized into 15th Air Defense Division on July 25, 1966. The divisions command was first at Pleso, and by order from June 13, 1969, it has been moved to Zagreb. Its task was aerial defense of western part of the airspace of Yugoslavia. It has consisted from four regiments, one fighter aviation regiment, two rocket air defense regiments and one air reconnaissance regiment, and other smaller units. It was disbanded on February 28, 1986, when its command was reorganized into command of 5th Corps of Air Force and Air Defense.

Assignments
Command of Yugoslav Air Force (1964-1978)
5th Aviation Corps (1978–1986)

Previous designations
5th Air Defense Zone (1964-1966)
15th Air Defense Division (1966-1986)

Organization
117th Fighter Aviation Regiment
155th Air Defense Missile Regiment
350th Air Defense Missile Regiment
5th Air Reconnaissance Regiment
220th Signal Battalion

Commanding officers

References

Divisions of Yugoslav Air Force
Military units and formations established in 1964
Military units and formations disestablished in 1986